This article presents a list of the historical events and publications of Australian literature during 1951.

Events 
 18 June – Frank Hardy is acquitted of criminal libel in the state of Victoria over his self-published 1950 roman à clef on corruption in Melbourne political life, Power Without Glory

Books 
 Dymphna Cusack – Say No to Death
 Dymphna Cusack and Florence James – Come In Spinner
 Eric Lambert – The Twenty Thousand Thieves
 Kenneth Mackenzie – Dead Men Rising
 Ruth Park – The Witch's Thorn
 Nevil Shute – Round the Bend
 Dal Stivens – Jimmy Brockett
 E. V. Timms – The Valleys Beyond
 Arthur Upfield – The New Shoe

Short stories 
 Henrietta Drake-Brockman & Walter Murdoch – Australian Short Stories (edited)
 Frank Hardy – The Man from Clinkapella and Other Prize-Winning Stories
 T. A. G. Hungerford – "The Only One Who Forgot"
 David Rowbotham – "A Schoolie and a Ghost"
 Judah Waten – "Read Politics, Son"
 Judith Wright – "The Ant-Lion"

Poetry 

 John Blight – "The Oyster-Eaters"
 David Campbell – "Windy Gap"
 Rosemary Dobson – "Detail from an Annunciation by Crivelli"
 W. E. Harney – "West of Alice"
 A. D. Hope – "The Brides"
 Rex Ingamells – The Great South Land : An Epic Poem
 Nancy Keesing – Imminent Summer
 Christopher Koch – "Half-Heard"
 Eve Langley – "Australia"
 Kenneth Mackenzie – "Caesura"
 Ray Mathew
 With Cypress Pine
 "Young Man's Fancy"
 Hal Porter – "Sheep"
 Elizabeth Riddell – "Forebears : The Map"
 Roland Robinson
 "I Had No Human Speech"
 "Rock-Lily"
 "The Tank"
 Douglas Stewart
 "Mahony's Mountain"
 "The Sunflowers"
 Judith Wright – "Inheritor"

Biography 
 Paul Brickhill
 The Dam Busters
 The Great Escape

Awards and honours

Literary

Children's and Young Adult

Poetry

Births 
A list, ordered by date of birth (and, if the date is either unspecified or repeated, ordered alphabetically by surname) of births in 1951 of Australian literary figures, authors of written works or literature-related individuals follows, including year of death.

 18 January – Sally Morgan, author and dramatist
 22 January – Steve J. Spears, playwright (died 2007)
 24 July – Robert Hood, novelist
 29 August – Janeen Webb, writer, critic and editor, mainly in the field of science fiction and fantasy
 12 October – Peter Goldsworthy, novelist
 16 November – Hazel Rowley, biographer (died 2011)
 25 November – Van Ikin, academic and editor

Unknown date
 Peter Boyle, poet
 Peter Craven, literary critic
 Stephen Edgar, poet and editor
 Jill Jones, poet
Valerie Parv, romance novelist (died 2021)
 Pi O, poet (in Greece)

Deaths 
A list, ordered by date of death (and, if the date is either unspecified or repeated, ordered alphabetically by surname) of deaths in 1951 of Australian literary figures, authors of written works or literature-related individuals follows, including year of birth.

 18 April – Daisy Bates, journalist (born 1859)
 25 June – Arthur Gask, novelist (born 1869)
 3 July – Sydney Jephcott, poet (born 1864)
 16 December – Percival Serle, biographer and bibliographer (born 1871)

See also 
 1951 in Australia
 1951 in literature
1951 in poetry
 List of years in Australian literature
List of years in literature

References

Literature
Australian literature by year
20th-century Australian literature
1951 in literature